Jin Ling (born 25 January 1967) is a Chinese athlete. She competed in the women's high jump at the 1988 Summer Olympics.

References

1967 births
Living people
Athletes (track and field) at the 1988 Summer Olympics
Chinese female high jumpers
Olympic athletes of China
Place of birth missing (living people)
Asian Games medalists in athletics (track and field)
Asian Games silver medalists for China
Athletes (track and field) at the 1998 Asian Games
Medalists at the 1998 Asian Games
Universiade bronze medalists for China
Universiade medalists in athletics (track and field)
Medalists at the 1989 Summer Universiade
20th-century Chinese women
21st-century Chinese women